The third cabinet of Recep Tayyip Erdogan was the government of Turkey from 2011 to 2014, during the 24th parliamentary term of the Grand National Assembly of Turkey. The cabinet succeeded the second Erdoğan cabinet following the 2011 Election.

New cabinet structure, 2011
On June 8, 2011, Prime Minister Recep Tayyip Erdoğan announced that his ruling Justice and Development Party (AKP) government is set to overhaul the current Cabinet structure, introducing six new ministries while making changes to the others.
 
Erdoğan made the new plan public in a press conference he called at the AKP's headquarters in Ankara. “We abolished eight state ministries, introduced six new ministries, merged two ministries and transformed two others,” Erdoğan said. The new ministries that have been introduced by Erdoğan are the Ministry of Family and Social Policy, the Ministry of European Union Affairs, the Ministry of Economy, the Ministry of Youth and Sports, the Ministry of Customs and Trade, and the Ministry of Development.

The Ministry of Public Works and Housing was renamed the Ministry of Environment and Urban Planning.

The name and structure of the two ministries were changed. The Ministry of Industry and Trade was replaced by the Ministry of Science, Industry and Technology. The Ministry of Agriculture and Rural Affairs was replaced by the Ministry of Food, Agriculture and Livestock.

Another novelty that has been introduced with regards to the structure of the ministries is a new post, that of deputy minister. Erdoğan said those serving as deputy ministers will serve as coordinators between the minister and his undersecretary. The prime minister said when the new Cabinet structure is adopted, 20 deputy ministers not from among serving deputies will be appointed to these posts.

Cabinet reshuffle, 2013

On the evening of 25 December 2013, after the resignation of three ministers earlier in the day in wake of the recently surfaced corruption investigation against the sons of all three of the resigning ministers as well as tens of other people close to the government, Prime Minister Erdoğan announced the reshuffle and replacement of 10 ministers in his cabinet. The changes were as follows:

 Emrullah İşler – Deputy Prime Minister – replacing Bekir Bozdağ (see below entry)
 Bekir Bozdağ – Minister of Justice – replacing Sadullah Ergin
 Ayşenur İslam – Minister of Family and Social Policy – replacing Fatma Şahin
 Nihat Zeybekci – Minister of Economy – replacing Zafer Çağlayan (who resigned)
 İdris Güllüce – Minister of Environment and Urban Planning – replacing Erdoğan Bayraktar (who resigned)
 Akif Çağatay Kılıç – Minister of Youth and Sports – replacing Suat Kılıç
 Efkan Ala – Minister of the Interior – replacing Muammer Güler (who resigned)
 Lütfi Elvan – Minister of Transport and Communication – replacing Binali Yıldırım
 Fikri Işık – Minister of Science, Industry and Technology – replacing Nihat Ergün
 Mevlüt Çavuşoğlu – Minister for European Union Affairs – replacing Egemen Bağış

Composition

See also 
 Cabinet of Turkey
 2013 corruption scandal in Turkey
 2014 Turkish presidential election

References 

Cabinet III
Erdogan III
Justice and Development Party (Turkey)
2011 establishments in Turkey
Cabinets established in 2011
2014 disestablishments in Turkey
Cabinets disestablished in 2014